The United States Senate election of 1920 in New York was held on November 2, 1920. Incumbent Republican Senator James Wolcott Wadsworth Jr. was re-elected to a second term over Democratic Lieutenant Governor Harry C. Walker.

Republican primary

Candidates
 Ella A. Boole, social reformer
 George Henry Payne, campaign manager for Theodore Roosevelt's 1912 campaign
 James Wolcott Wadsworth Jr., incumbent Senator

Results

Democratic primary

Candidates
 George R. Lunn, Mayor of Schenectady and former U.S. Representative
 Harry C. Walker, Lieutenant Governor of New York

Results

General election

Candidates
 Ella A. Boole, social reformer (Prohibition)
 Harry Carlson (Socialist Labor)
 Jacob Panken, Judge of the New York City Municipal Court (Socialist)
 Rose Schneiderman, feminist and labor leader (Farmer-Labor)
 Harry C. Walker, Lieutenant Governor of New York (Democratic)
 James Wolcott Wadsworth Jr., incumbent Senator (Republican)

Results

References

1920
New York
1920 New York (state) elections